Nick James may refer to:

 Nick James (cricketer) (born 1986), English cricketer
 Nick James (critic), British film critic
 Nicholas James (actor), American actor also credited as Nick James
 Nick James (American football) (born 1993), defensive tackle